Ludwig Emil Grimm (14 March 1790 – 4 April 1863) was a German painter, art professor, etcher and copper engraver.

Early life 
Grimm was born in Hanau, Germany, in 1790. His brothers Jacob and Wilhelm Grimm were folklorists.

Education 
Grimm studies began at the Kunsthochschule Kassel and Philip Otto Runge, then from 1809 to 1817, he studied at Academy of Fine Arts Munich.

In the 1814, he worked as an officer in the campaign against Napoleon.

In 1816, he travelled to Italy where he learned engraving from Carl Ernst Christoph Hess and published his first work; a sketchbook of engravings based on his Italian journey.

Career 
In 1819, Grimm contributed the frontispiece for the second edition of Kinder- und Hausmärchen (Grimm's Fairy Tales).

In 1823 and 1826 he was able to secure commissions for two series of portraits of scholars, professors and doctors, thanks to his brothers' connections to the academic community in Göttingen. 

In 1832, he helped Gerhardt Wilhelm von Reutern found the artists' colony in Willingshausen where he became a Professor of history painting at the Kassel Academy.

In 1842, two years after his first wife's death, he married the daughter of Reform theologian .

Death
In 1863, he died of pneumonia  in Kassel.

Legacy
In 2012, the city of Hanau has awarded the "Ludwig Emil Grimm Prize" to young artists. 

In  2014, a life-size bronze statue of him was dedicated there in front of the "Zum Riesen" hotel as a gift to the city from the hotel's owners, which was designed by the painter .

Writings 
 Erinnerungen aus meinem Leben (Memoirs of My Life), edited with commentary by Adolf Stoll. Hesse & Becker, Leipzig 1911 (Digitalized).

Selected works

References

 Herbert von Bose: Das Bild des Fremden im Werk von Ludwig Emil Grimm (1790-1863) (Images of the Strange in the Work of...) Tectum Verlag, Marburg 2007,

External links 

 
 
 Brüder Grimm-Museum Kassel and Brüder Grimm-Gesellschaft  
 Malerkolonie Willingshausen

1790 births
1863 deaths
Academy of Fine Arts, Munich alumni
19th-century German painters
19th-century German male artists
German male painters
German illustrators
People from Hanau
Artists from Kassel